Florian Fischerauer (born 1 January 1999) is an Austrian footballer who plays as a midfielder for the reserve team of FC Admira Wacker Mödling.

External links

 

Austrian footballers
Austrian Football Bundesliga players
FC Admira Wacker Mödling players
1999 births
Living people
Association football midfielders